Hwang Wang-hsiang is a Taiwanese politician. He currently serves as the Deputy Minister of the National Development Council of the Executive Yuan since 22 January 2014.

Early life
Hwang obtained his master's degree in architecture and urban planning from Chinese Culture University in 1984 and doctoral degree in land economics from National Chengchi University in 1994.

See also
 National Development Council (Republic of China)

References

Government ministers of Taiwan
Living people
Year of birth missing (living people)
National Cheng Kung University alumni
Chinese Culture University alumni
National Chengchi University alumni